Jonathan Slater (born 29 November 1961) has been a high ranking British civil servant. From May 2016, he was Permanent Secretary of the Department for Education until his abrupt dismissal on 26 August 2020 following a controversy over national school examination grades.

Career 
Slater entered Civil Service in 2001 joining the Cabinet Office, having previously worked for the London Borough of Islington. After four years there, he moved to the Prime Minister's Delivery Unit at Number 10 Policy Unit in 2005, working on NHS reform and the capability review programme. In 2006, he transferred to the Ministry of Justice, working in the National Offender Management Service as its Director of Performance & Improvement, and then in 2008 as Chief Executive of the Office for Criminal Justice Reform, before being promoted in 2009 to Director-General, Transformation.

In July 2011, Slater moved to the Ministry of Defence as its Director-General, Transformation and Corporate Strategy, encouraged by his former Permanent Secretary Ursula Brennan. His position was subsequently changed to Director-General, Head Office and Commissioning Services.

In October 2015, Slater was appointed head of the Economic and Domestic Secretariat at the Cabinet Office, replacing Melanie Dawes. Seven months later he was again promoted to Permanent Secretary of the Department for Education, succeeding Chris Wormald who moved to the then-Department of Health.

In August 2020, the prime minister concluded that there was "a need for fresh official leadership” and Slater announced he was stepping down with effect from 1 September. The general secretary of the FDA union, Dave Penman, attacked the sacking in the following terms": "If it wasn't clear before, then it certainly is now - this administration will throw civil service leaders under a bus without a moment's hesitation to shield ministers from any kind of accountability." Slater was the fifth top civil servant to be sacked in as many months.

See also
Sally Collier

References

Offices held 

Living people
1961 births
British civil servants
Civil servants in the Ministry of Defence (United Kingdom)
Civil servants in the Cabinet Office
Civil servants in the Department of Education (United Kingdom)
British Permanent Secretaries
Permanent Under-Secretaries of State for Education and Skills